Pleasant Gap may refer to:
Pleasant Gap, Alabama
Pleasant Gap, Missouri
Pleasant Gap Township, Bates County, Missouri
Pleasant Gap, Pennsylvania
Pleasant Gap, Virginia